The 1900 United States presidential election in California took place on November 6, 1900 as part of the 1900 United States presidential election. State voters chose nine representatives, or electors, to the Electoral College, who voted for president and vice president.

California voted for the Republican incumbent, William McKinley, in a landslide over the Democratic challenger, former Nebraska representative and 1896 nominee William Jennings Bryan.

Results

Results by county

References

California
1900
1900 California elections